Donald Alexander MacKinnon (22 February 1863 – 20 April 1928) was a Canadian teacher, lawyer, politician, author, and the eighth  Lieutenant Governor of Prince Edward Island from 1904 to 1910.

Born in Uigg, Prince Edward Island, the son of William and Catherine Nicholson Mackinnon, MacKinnon attended Uigg grammar school and started teaching when he was 14. He later received a first-class teaching licence from the Prince of Wales College in Charlottetown. In 1882, he started articling with the Charlottetown barrister Malcolm McLeod. From 1885 to 1887, he attended Dalhousie Law School where he received a Bachelor of Laws degree. He was called to the Bar an attorney in 1887 and a barrister in 1888. He was created a Queen's Counsel in 1899. He opened a practice in Georgetown, Prince Edward Island in 1887 where he remained until moving to Charlottetown in 1897. In 1900, he became president of the Law Society of Prince Edward Island.

From 1893 to 1900, he was a member of the Legislative Assembly of Prince Edward Island for the electoral district of 4th Kings. In 1899, he was chosen as attorney general in the cabinet of Donald Farquharson; however, as a result of the appointment, he was required to run for reelection and he was defeated.

He was elected to the House of Commons of Canada as the Liberal candidate for the electoral district of East Queen's in the 1900 federal election. In 1901, the election was declared void and MacKinnon was re-elected in the resulting 1901 by-election. In 1904, he was appointed Lieutenant Governor of Prince Edward Island and served until 1910. He returned to federal politics when he was elected to the House of Commons for electoral district of Queen's in the 1921 federal election. MacKinnon died in Charlottetown in 1928.

References

External links
 
 

1863 births
1928 deaths
People from Queens County, Prince Edward Island
Liberal Party of Canada MPs
Lieutenant Governors of Prince Edward Island
Members of the House of Commons of Canada from Prince Edward Island
Prince Edward Island Liberal Party MLAs
Canadian King's Counsel